Pre or PRE may refer to:

Places
Preston railway station, UK National Rail code PRE
Prince Edward station, on Hong Kong's MTR

People
Steve Prefontaine (1951–1975), an American runner nicknamed "Pre"

Arts, entertainment, and media
Pre (band), British band
Public Radio East, regional network for NPR

Technology
<pre>…</pre>, HTML element for pre-formatted text
Microphone preamplifier
Palm Pre, a smartphone
Partial redundancy elimination, computer compiler optimization
Personal Rescue Enclosure, for spacecraft

Other uses
Andalusian horse or Pura Raza Española
Proportionate reduction of error, in statistics

See also